Pishkeli Jan, also rendered as Peshgel Jan, may refer to:
 Pishkeli Jan-e Bala
 Pishkeli Jan-e Pain